Hebius inas, commonly known as the Malayan mountain keelback or Gunung Inas keelback, is a species of snake of the family Colubridae.

Geographic range
The snake is found in Peninsular Malaysia, Sumatra (Indonesia), and Thailand.

References 

inas
Snakes of Southeast Asia
Reptiles of Indonesia
Reptiles of Malaysia
Reptiles of Thailand
Reptiles described in 1901
Taxa named by Frank Fortescue Laidlaw